Jewels 18th Ring was a mixed martial arts (MMA) event held by promotion Jewels on  at Shin-Kiba 1st Ring in Koto, Tokyo, Japan.

Results

Opening card
1st opening fight: Jewels amateur kickboxing rules -49 kg, 2:00 x 2 rounds
 Miki (WSR Fairtechs) vs.  Akiko Someya (BomboFreely)
Someya defeated Siki by unanimous decision (20-17, 20-18, 20-18).

2nd opening fight: Jewels amateur kickboxing rules -54 kg, 2:00 x 2 rounds
 Wano Sato (Shinko Muay Thai Gym) vs.  Reina Matsuda (y-park)
Matsuda defeated Sato by unanimous decision (20-18, 20-18, 20-19).

3rd opening fight: Jewels amateur rules -47.5 kg, 4:00 x 1 round
 Satomi Takano (Club Barbarian) vs.  Miyuki Irie (Alliance Narita)
Takano defeated Irie by submission (Guillotine Choke) at 1:05 of round 1.

Main card
1st match: Jewels grappling rules -51 kg, 4:00 / 2 rounds
 Miyoko Kusaka (Grabaka Gym) vs.  Mina Kurobe (K Taro Dojo)
Kusaka defeated Kurobe by submission (leg scissor choke) at 3:17 of round 2.

2nd match: Jewels official rules -52 kg bout, 5:00 x 2 rounds
 Celine Haga (Team Hellboy Hansen) vs.  Ayame Miura (Free)
Miura defeated Haga by submission (keylock) at 2:12 of round 2.

3rd match: Jewels official rules -52 kg bout, 5:00 x 2 rounds
 Emi Tomimatsu (Paraestra Matsudo) vs.  Yuko Oya (DEEP OFFICIAL GYM IMPACT)
Tomimatsu defeated Oya by unanimous decision.

4th match: Jewels kickboxing rules -61.5 kg bout, 2:00 / 3 rounds
 Yui Takada (Mine Kokorokai) vs.  Satoko Ozawa (Team Dragon)
Takada defeated Ozawa by majority decision (30-28, 30-29, 29-29).

5th match: Jewels official rules -53.5 kg bout, 5:00 x 2 rounds
 Mizuki Inoue (White Heart Karate Association) vs.  Alexandra Chambers (VT-1 Gym)
Inoue defeated Chambers by submission (armbar) at 4:32 of round 1.

6th match: Jewels official rules -58 kg bout, 5:00 x 2 rounds
 Roxanne Modafferi (Wajutsu Keishukai Hearts) vs.  Takayo Hashi (Wajutsu Keishukai Akza)
Hashi defeated Modafferi by unanimous decision.

7th match: Jewels official rules -52 kg bout, 5:00 x 2 rounds
 Mika Nagano (Core) vs.  Emi Fujino (Wajutsu Keishukai Gods)
Fujino defeated Nagano by unanimous decision.

References

Jewels (mixed martial arts) events
2012 in mixed martial arts
Mixed martial arts in Japan
Sports competitions in Tokyo
2012 in Japanese sport